

Famous residents of Szczecin

Before 1800 

 Philipp Dulichius (1562–1631), German composer
 Catherine the Great (1729–1796), empress of Russia
 Franz Kasimir von Kleist (1736–1808), Prussian general
 Sophie Dorothea of Württemberg (1759–1828), the second wife of Tsar Paul I of Russia
 Friedrich von Adelung (1768–1843), linguist, historian and bibliographer
 Friedrich Gilly (1772–1800), architect
 Henryka Beyer (1782–1855) painter
 Friedrich Graf von Wrangel (1784–1877), Prussian Field Marshal
 Carl Loewe (1796–1869) composer, lived in Stettin
 Heinrich Philipp August Damerow (1798–1866), psychiatrist
 Karl Loeillot (1798–1864), painter and lithographer

1800–1850 

 Theodor Hildebrandt (1804–1874) painter
 Carl August Dohrn (1806–1892), entomologist
 Franz Theodor Kugler (1808–1858) art historian
 Carl Gustav Friedrich Hasselbach (1809–1882), mayor of Magdeburg
 Hermann Günther Grassmann (1809–1877) mathematician, physicist and linguist
 Robert Prutz (1816–1872) poet
 Franz San Galli (1824–1908), inventor of radiator (central heating system)
 Hermann Julius Grüneberg (1827–1894), chemist 
 Felicita Vestvali (1831-1880), opera singer and actress
 A. F. Marx (1838–1904), publisher
 Anton Dohrn (1840–1909) first director of the Stazione Zoologica, Naples, Italy
 Otto von Gierke (1841–1921) historian
 Oscar Hammerstein I (1847–1919), composer

1850–1900 

 Ernst Zitelmann (1852 -1923) jurist
 Carl Ludwig Schleich (1859–1922), author
 Max Berg (1870–1947) architect
 Leon Jessel (1871–1942), composer
 Wolfgang Wegener (1875–1956), officer in the Imperial German Navy
 Alfred Döblin (1878–1957), writer
 Traugott Konstantin Oesterreich (1880–1949), religious parapsychologist and philosopher
 Fritz Gerlich (1883–1934) journalist
 Rudolf Olden (1885–1940), journalist and lawyer
 Johannes Theodor Baargeld (1892–1927) painter and poet
 Heinrich George (1893–1946), actor 
 Erich Böhlke (1895–1979), conductor and componist
 Karl Weinbacher (1898–1946), German manager and war criminal
 Hans Heinrich von Twardowski (1898–1958) film actor

1900–1945 

 Hans Kammler (1901–1945), German general
 Werner Seelenbinder (1904–1944) politician
 Gustav Gerneth (1905-2019) the world's oldest living man 
 Konstanty Ildefons Gałczyński (1905–1953), poet
 Erwin Ackerknecht (1906–1988), historian  
 Dita Parlo (1906–1971) film actress
 Kurt Kuhnke (1910—1969), motorcyclist
 Ernst Bader (1914–1999) actor and songwriter
 Jürgen Dethloff (1924–2002), inventor
 Helga Deen (1925–1943) Dutch prison camp diarist
 Wolfhart Pannenberg (born 1928), Christian theologian
 Thomas Geve (born 1929), engineer, author and Jewish Holocaust survivor
 Ellen Schwiers (1930–2019), actress of stage, film, and television
 Rudi Strahl (1931–2001), playwright, novelist and lyricist.
 Manfred Stolpe (1936–2019), former Prime Minister of Brandenburg
 Christian Tomuschat (born 1936), expert in international law, professor at the Humboldt University of Berlin
 Wolfgang Weber (born in 1939), classical cellist
 Knut Kiesewetter (born 1941) musician
 Michael Bürsch (born 1942) politician
 Michael Holm (born 1943) singer-songwriter

After 1945

 Chava Alberstein (born 1947), Israeli female singer and composer of songs
 Piotr Andrejew (born 1947), Polish screenwriter and film director, born in Szczecin
 Franciszek Białous (1901–1980), Polish microbiologist, settled in Szczecin in 1946
 Ryszard Kotla (born 1947) historian, travel writer, journalist, engineer, born in Szczecin-Dąbie
 Inka Dowlasz (born 1949) Polish theater director, playwright, screenwriter, psychologist and teacher
 Jerzy Zielinski (born 1950) Polish cinematographer active in Hollywood
 Krzysztof Warlikowski (born 1962), Polish theatre director
 Aneta Kreglicka (born 1965), First runner-up Miss International 1989 and Miss World 1989
 Kasia Nosowska (born 1971), singer of Szczecin-based rock band Hey
 Agata Kulesza (born 1971), Polish actress
 Radosław Majdan (born 1972) Poland national goalkeeper
 Grzegorz Napieralski (born 1974), Polish left-wing politician
 Ilona Ostrowska (born 1974), Polish actress
 Maciej Jewtuszko (born 1981) Mixed Martial Artist, currently competes in WEC.
 Cleo, (born 1983), singer who represented Poland at the Eurovision Song Contest 2014
 Marek Kowal (born 1985), Polish footballer
 Paul Ziemiak (born 1985), German politician (CDU)
 Izuagbe Ugonoh (born 1986), Polish-Nigerian mixed martial artist and boxer
 Marcin Lewandowski (born 1987), Polish middle-distance runner
 Klaudia Ungerman (born 1988), Miss Poland 2008
 Kamil Grosicki (born 1988), Polish footballer
 Rafał Janicki (born 1992), Polish footballer
 Bartosz Zmarzlik (born, 1995), Polish motorcycle speedway rider
 Young Leosia (born, 1998), Polish singer, rapper, songwriter and DJ
 Blanka Stajkow (born, 1999), Polish singer, fashion model

 
Szczecin